Jack Lucas may refer to:

Jacklyn H. Lucas (1928-2008), United States Marine who is the youngest to receive the Medal of Honor, at age 17
Jack Lucas (footballer) (born 1961), Australian rules footballer for the Sydney Swans